La Paloma is a city in Chaco Province, Argentina.

References 

Populated places in Chaco Province